Emanuele Catania (born 3 October 1988) is an Italian long jumper.

Biography
Emanuele Catania won a medal at the 2013 Mediterranean Games.

Achievements

National titles
1 win in the long jump outdoor (2014)
1 win in the long jump indoor (2015)

See also
 Italy at the 2013 Mediterranean Games

References

External links
 

1988 births
Athletics competitors of Fiamme Gialle
Italian male long jumpers
Living people
Athletes from Rome
Mediterranean Games bronze medalists for Italy
Athletes (track and field) at the 2013 Mediterranean Games
Mediterranean Games medalists in athletics